Lorna Blake (born 13 October 1953) is a Puerto Rican former swimmer. She competed in four events at the 1968 Summer Olympics.

References

1953 births
Living people
Puerto Rican female swimmers
Olympic swimmers of Puerto Rico
Swimmers at the 1968 Summer Olympics
Sportspeople from Havana
20th-century Puerto Rican women
21st-century Puerto Rican women